A number of revolts against the Turkish Revolutionaries broke out during the Turkish War of Independence.

Mustafa Kemal, who was the leader of the nationalist government of Turkey during the war of independence was primarily concerned about subduing the internal revolts and establishing domestic security. To achieve this, the parliament passed the Law of Treachery to the Homeland and established Mobile Gendarmerie Troops. These revolts had the effect of delaying the nationalist movement's struggle against the occupying foreign forces on several fronts. These revolts, such as those by Ahmed Anzavur, were put down with some difficulty by nationalist forces.

References

Turkish War of Independence
Wars involving Turkey
1919 in the Ottoman Empire
1920 in the Ottoman Empire
 
Rebellions against the Ottoman Empire
Subsidiary conflicts of World War I